Land of the Free may refer to:

Music

Anthems
 "Land of the Free" (anthem), the national anthem of Belize by Selwyn Walford Young
 A phrase in "The Star-Spangled Banner", national anthem of the United States
 A nickname for the United States in general

Other music
 Land of the Free (Gamma Ray album), 1995
 Land of the Free II, by Gamma Ray
 Land of the Free (Martin Zobel album), 2012
 Land of the Free?, a 2001 album by Pennywise, a California punk rock band
 "Land of the Free" (Joey Badass song), a 2017 song from the album All-Amerikkkan Badass
 "Land of the Free" (The Killers song), 2019

Film and TV
 Land of the Free (film), a 1998 film featuring William Shatner
"Land of the Free", a 1980 episode of Knots Landing
"Land of the Free", a 1988 episode of Cagney and Lacey

Books
A line in "Defence of Fort M'Henry", 1814 poem by Francis Scott Key 
"Land of the Free", a 1938 poem by Archibald MacLeish
 Land of the Free, a 2014 novel by American author Woodrow Landfair